A Promise for Joyce is a 1959 novel by Lois Duncan, under the pen name Lois Kerry. It is a sequel to her debut novel, Love Song for Joyce (1958).

Plot
After a tumultuous first year away from home at Denton College, Joyce enrolls for her sophomore year of classes, and finds herself troubled by her boyfriend's strenuous pre-med studies.

See also
Love Song for Joyce

References

External links
A Promise for Joyce at Fantastic Fiction

1959 American novels
American bildungsromans
Novels by Lois Duncan
Sequel novels
Works published under a pseudonym
Funk & Wagnalls books